The 2001 UEFA Women's Championship was the eighth UEFA Women's Championship, a competition for the women's national football teams and member associations of UEFA. It took place in Germany between 23 June and 7 July 2001. It was won by Germany with 1–0 in the final against Sweden, after a golden goal.

Qualification

16 competing teams formed 4 groups; the winners of each group qualified for the Championship, while the teams finishing second and third had to play a playoff in order to qualify.

Qualified teams

1 Bold indicates champion for that year. Italic indicates host for that year
2 As West Germany

Squads
For a list of all squads that played in the final tournament, see UEFA Women's Euro 2001 squads

Results

Group stage

Group A

Group B

Knockout stage

Semi-finals

Final

Goalscorers
3 goals
 Claudia Müller
 Sandra Smisek

2 goals

 Gitte Krogh
 Marinette Pichon
 Maren Meinert
 Bettina Wiegmann
 Patrizia Panico
 Dagny Mellgren
 Hanna Ljungberg

1 goal

 Julie Hauge Andersson
 Christina Bonde
 Julie Rydahl Bukh
 Merete Pedersen
 Angela Banks
 Stéphanie Mugneret-Béghé
 Gaëlle Blouin
 Françoise Jézéquel
 Renate Lingor
 Birgit Prinz
 Petra Wimbersky
 Rita Guarino
 Monica Knudsen
 Alexandra Svetlitskaya
 Kristin Bengtsson
 Sofia Eriksson
 Linda Fagerström
 Tina Nordlund
 Jane Törnqvist

Own goal
 Emmanuelle Sykora (playing against Norway)

References

External links
UEFA Women's Euro 2001 at UEFA.com
UEFA Women's Euro 2001 at Rec.Sport.Soccer Statistics Foundation

 
Women's Championship
2001
2001
2001 in women's association football
2000–01 in German women's football
2001 in Swedish women's football
2000–01 in English women's football
2001 in Russian football
2000–01 in Danish women's football
2001 in Norwegian women's football
2000–01 in French women's football
2000–01 in Italian women's football
June 2001 sports events in Europe
July 2001 sports events in Europe